This is a list of Brazilian television related events from 2001.

Events

Debuts

2000s
12 October - Sítio do Picapau Amarelo (2001–2007)

Television shows

1970s
Turma da Mônica (1976–present)

1990s
Malhação (1995–present)
Cocoricó (1996–present)

Ending this year

Births

Deaths

See also
2001 in Brazil
List of Brazilian films of 2001